Georg Franz Weber (born 1962) is a German-born oncologist, who has made substantial contributions to the exploration of metastasis by defining the physiologic role of metastasis genes as stress response genes and by discovering the interaction between the molecules osteopontin and CD44. While he continues to address fundamental questions, he is researching new venues of diagnosis and therapy of cancer dissemination.

Biography 
Georg F. Weber was educated in Erlangen, Germany. He then attended medical school at the University of Würzburg, Germany. In 1988, he graduated and also completed his doctoral thesis.

Early in his intellectual life (1981–1991), Weber wrote publications on chess and biomechanics. His medical career was initially focused on immunology, in particular on the regulation of host defenses through redox mechanisms. Among various phenomena, he identified signal transduction pathways inside T-lymphocytes that determine cell proliferation, programmed cell death, or immunosenescence.

At the turn of the year 1988/1989, Weber migrated to the United States. He worked at the Dana–Farber Cancer Institute, Harvard Medical School from 1990 to 1999. After a stint at Tufts University, he moved to the University of Cincinnati, where he is currently on the faculty at the College of Pharmacy and the Cancer Center.

Georg F. Weber has defined the genetic basis of metastasis formation as aberrant expression or splicing of a unique set of developmentally non-essential genes (stress response genes) that physiologically mediate the homing of immune system cells. Specifically, his laboratory has studied the cytokine osteopontin, which acts as a metastasis gene in multiple malignancies, including breast cancer. Based on the molecular mechanisms of osteopontin induction and function in cancer metastasis, he has established the following paradigms:
1. Osteopontin and variant CD44 interact, and this is essential for metastasis by several types of cancer. 
2. Multiple osteopontin splice variants are present in malignant, but not in benign human breast tumor cells.
3. Metastasis genes support anchorage-independence in an autocrine fashion.
4. In cancer cells, distinct signal transduction pathways to growth and invasiveness are activated by oncogenes. 
5. The expression (activation) of metastasis genes is triggered by cellular stress response programs and is regulated by multi-subunit transcription factor complexes.

Georg F. Weber is the author of multiple monographs, including textbooks on molecular oncology.

References

External links
 Weber's Faculty Profile at the University of Cincinnati

1962 births
Living people
Harvard Medical School people
German oncologists